It Prevails is an American five-piece metalcore band from Portland, Oregon, formed in 2004. The band is influenced by melodic metalcore and classic rock, including Shai Hulud, Twelve Tribes, Strongarm, Lifetime and Hot Water Music. A premium was placed on lyrics related to struggles of the human condition and altruistic actions.

History
The band formed in 2004. Releasing the EP Indelible in May 2005. After touring the U.S. West Coast twice in 2006, the quintet finalized their debut album, The Inspiration, which was released in 2007 through Rise Records.

In 2008, the band recorded their second album Capture and Embrace for the small independent label, Rain City Records. The band teamed up with guitarist and producer Beau Burchell (of Saosin) to mix the effort, but the band went on a hiatus period after original drummer Aaron Marsh decided to leave. They also parted ways with a guitarist under "personal reasons". Those issues caused the cancellation of their tours with Ligiea, Since The Flood, Means and Farewell to Freeway. Capture and Embrace was not supported by any national tour, save a brief West Coast tour in 2009 before their first European tour in August 2009.

After more line-up changes and a relocation to Colorado, It Prevails announced, through their official Myspace page, the addition of guitarist Bobby VaLeu and drummer Ian Clark. They also announced the release of a three-track EP, Findings, and their summer tour with Close Your Eyes. Followed up with a UK and mainland European tour with Heart in Hand.

Coming back from the UK in 2010, It Prevails teamed up with up-and-coming Canadian acts Counterparts and A Sight for Sewn Eyes. This resulted in It Prevails' first tour of Eastern Canada in late 2010, during which the band shot a music video for the song "Placed In My Hands." On the way home from Canada, It Prevails shot the music video for "An Anomaly" outside of Birmingham, Alabama. In 2011 the band signed a deal with Mediaskare Records, which resulted in an album entitled Stroma, released on July 19, 2011.

In 2011 and 2012, It Prevails released three new songs, eventually announcing that a new album was being written, entitled Perdition. In April 2013, the band added Joe Butler and Nate George of Agraceful as their new lead guitarist and drummer as well as Billy Adams on bass.

The final mixing/tracking for the new album was only solidified and absolutely complete in October 2014, after almost two years since the recording process began. The band has hinted that the material is their favorite of the four albums, but more than likely, their last. Ideas of a final US tour have also been clued. On January 20, 2015, the band released their fourth full-length album Perdition.

After four years of silence, the band debuted their first single off their upcoming EP A Life Worth Living, "Lair Hill", on July 8, 2019. The EP will be released through StaySick Recordings. This is the first song to feature Capsize's old guitarist Ryan Knowles since joining the band.

Discography
 Indelible (EP) (Self-Released, 2005)
 The Inspiration (Rise Records, 2007)
 Capture & Embrace (Rain City Records, 2009)
 Findings (EP) (The Form Records, 2010)
 Re:Findings - split with evylock (Falling Leaves Records, 2011)
 Stroma (Mediaskare Records, 2011)
 Perdition (Mediaskare Records, 2015)
 A Life Worth Living (EP) (2019)

Members
Current 
James Ian Fike - vocals (2004–2016, 2019-present)
Cameron Bledsoe - bass (2006–2009, 2019-present)
Therron Francis - guitar (2008-2009, 2019-present)
Dave Catuccio - drums (2014-2016, 2019-present)
Ryan Knowles - guitar, backing vocals (2019-present)

Former
Alex Kutsche - guitar (2004–2006, 2009–2010), bass (2009–2010)
Brian Blade - guitar (2005–2008)
Daniel Harbold - guitar & vocals (2007-2008)
Nic Toten - guitar (2008, 2011–2016)
Jake Harris - guitar (2007, 2010–2011)
Chris Tsanjoures - guitar (2010–2013)
Nate Dorval - bass (2010–2013)
Aaron Marsh - drums (2004–2008, 2011)
Tanner Bama - drums (2008–2009)
Ian Clark - drums (2009–2010)
Jarrod Rose - drums (2011–2013)
Nate George - drums (2013–2014)

Touring musicians
Kyle Lottman - guitar (2008)
Bobby VaLeu - guitar (2009–2010)
Derek Zook - drums (2010)

Timeline

References

Musical groups established in 2004
Melodic hardcore groups
American post-hardcore musical groups
Metalcore musical groups from Oregon